Thorncombe Beacon is a hill between Bridport and Charmouth in Dorset, England. It is in the south-west part of Symondsbury parish close to the parish of Chideock. It forms part of the Jurassic Coast, a World Heritage Site and the South West Coast Path and the Monarch's Way skirt the hilltop.

The hill is owned by the National Trust. Three bowl barrows to the north-east of the summit constitute a scheduled monument.

References 

Headlands of Dorset
Hills of Dorset
National Trust properties in Dorset
Jurassic Coast